The Gare de Perpignan murders is a French criminal case. Between 1995 and 2001, four girls disappeared, and three were found dead in similar conditions. Authorities initially thought it was the work of a serial killer. In June 2015, three of the four disappearances were cleared up and involved two different murderers.

History 
Four girls of similar appearance disappeared near the station area in Perpignan, France. The victims were:

 Tatiana Andújar (17) 24 September 1995
 Mokhtaria Chaïb (19) 21 December 1997	
 Marie-Hélène Gonzalez (22) 16 June 1998	
 Fatima Idrahou (23) 19 February 2001

Tatiana Andújar has never been found, dead or alive. The three other girls were found dead in a state of undress. Chaïb and Gonzalez 's genitals had been mutilated. González head and hands were found in a trash bag six months after the disappearance. The personal effects of every victim are still not found.

Fatima Idrahou 
A witness saw the type, the color and a part of the number plate of the car in which the fourth victim, Fatima Idrahou, was kidnapped. A bar manager, Marc Delpech, who was married and a father, was arrested fourteen days after the crime. Delpech confessed the murder while in custody. He explained his crime by saying that she had rejected his advances. Her undressed body was found on the bank of the pool of Canet-en-Roussillon. On 18 June, Marc Delpech was sentenced to thirty years of imprisonment with a minimum of twenty years without the possibility of parole. The sentence was affirmed in the appeal court.

Mokhtaria Chaïb and Marie-Hélène Gonzalez 
In the middle of October 2014, the DNA of Mokhtaria Chaïb's assailant was identified as Jacques Rançon, a then 54-year-old father of four children. He had moved to Perpignan in 1997, the year he killed her. Jacques Rançon had been repeatedly convicted of sexual assault and violence, including a rape. Rançon confessed to the rape and the murder of Mokhtaria Chaïb while in custody. He was exonerated of the disappearance of Tatiana Andújar, because he was in prison at the time. He remains a suspect in the death of Gonzalez. On 18 June 2015, Rançon confessed to the murder of Marie-Hélène Gonzalez.

Tatiana Andújar 
Tatiana Andújar has never been found, dead or alive. Her disappearance has not been solved.

References

External links
  Disparues de Perpignan : 20 ans de mystère et un nouveau suspect, on nouvelobs.com

Murder in France 
1995 murders in France 
1997 murders in France 
1998 murders in France 
2001 murders in France
Crime in Occitania (administrative region)